Ken McGregor and Frank Sedgman were the defending champions, but were ineligible to compete after turning professional.

Lew Hoad and Ken Rosewall defeated Rex Hartwig and Mervyn Rose in the final, 6–4, 7–5, 4–6, 7–5 to win the gentlemen's doubles tennis title at the 1953 Wimbledon Championship.

Seeds

  Lew Hoad /  Ken Rosewall (champions)
  Gardnar Mulloy /  Vic Seixas (semifinals)
  Rex Hartwig /  Mervyn Rose (final)
  Jaroslav Drobný /  Budge Patty (third round)

Draw

Finals

Top half

Section 1

Section 2

Bottom half

Section 3

Section 4

References

External links

Men's Doubles
Wimbledon Championship by year – Men's doubles